Axel Alejandro Pérez Etchelar (born 18 February 2002) is a Uruguayan professional footballer who plays as a forward for Racing Montevideo.

Club career
A youth academy graduate of Nacional, Pérez made his professional debut on 29 March 2021 in a 2–1 league win against Deportivo Maldonado. In April 2021, Pérez and his Nacional teammate Santiago Cartagena joined Montevideo City Torque on a loan deal until 31 December 2022.

In January 2023, Pérez joined Racing Montevideo after terminating his contract with Nacional.

International career
Pérez is a former Uruguayan youth international. He was included in the national team for 2019 South American U-17 Championship.

Career statistics

Honours
Nacional
Uruguayan Primera División: 2020

References

External links
 

2002 births
Living people
Footballers from Montevideo
Association football forwards
Uruguayan footballers
Uruguay youth international footballers
Uruguayan Primera División players
Club Nacional de Football players
Montevideo City Torque players
Racing Club de Montevideo players